Kteni is a village located in Aiani municipal unit, Kozani regional unit, in the Greek region of Macedonia. It is situated at an altitude of 680 meters. The postal code is 50004, while the telephone code is +30 24610. At the 2011 census, the population was 73.

The town of Kozani, seat of the regional unit, is 21 km from Kteni.

There is also a nearby castle, that was destroyed in 1649 by Albanian gangs. Its ruins are still present to this day. The village of Kteni lies close to Mount Bourinos.

References

Populated places in Kozani (regional unit)